Opisthodontia is a genus of moths in the family Lasiocampidae. The genus was erected by Per Olof Christopher Aurivillius in 1895.

Species
Opisthodontia afroio Zolotuhin & Prozorov, 2010
Opisthodontia arnoldi Aurivillius, 1908
Opisthodontia avinoffi Tams, 1929
Opisthodontia axividia Zolotuhin & Prozorov, 2010
Opisthodontia budamara Zolotuhin & Prozorov, 2010
Opisthodontia cardinalli Tams, 1926
Opisthodontia cymographa Hampson, 1910
Opisthodontia dannfelti Aurivillius, 1895
Opisthodontia dentata Aurivillius, 1900
Opisthodontia denticulata Romieux, 1943
Opisthodontia diva Zolotuhin & Prozorov, 2010
Opisthodontia flavipicta Tams, 1929
Opisthodontia haigi Tams, 1935
Opisthodontia hollandi Tams, 1929
Opisthodontia jordani Tams, 1936
Opisthodontia kahli Tams, 1929
Opisthodontia micha Druce, 1899
Opisthodontia obscura Hering, 1941
Opisthodontia ochrosticta Kiriakoff, 1963
Opisthodontia pygmy Zolotuhin & Prozorov, 2010
Opisthodontia rothschildi Tams, 1936
Opisthodontia rotundata Berio, 1937
Opisthodontia sidha Zolotuhin & Prozorov, 2010
Opisthodontia sonithella Zolotuhin & Prozorov, 2010
Opisthodontia spodopasta Tams, 1931
Opisthodontia superba Aurivillius, 1915
Opisthodontia supramalis Zolotuhin & Prozorov, 2010
Opisthodontia tamsi Kiriakoff, 1963
Opisthodontia tessmanni Hering, 1928
Opisthodontia varezhka Zolotuhin & Prozorov, 2010
Opisthodontia vensani Zolotuhin & Prozorov, 2010

References

Lasiocampidae
Moth genera